The Chicago Southland is a region comprising the south and southwest suburbs of the City of Chicago in the U.S. state of Illinois. Home to roughly 2.5 million residents, this region has been known as the Southland by the local populace and regional media for over 20 years. Despite this relatively recent term, some older native Southlanders and current local advertisements colloquially refer to the Southland as the Southside, meaning on the southern side/border of Chicago as extended into the suburbs since some of them previously lived on Chicago's Southside but moved to the suburbs during post WWII white flight. 

There is great racial and economic diversity in the Southland, with low and middle income areas to the north and higher income areas farther south and west.

The southland is home to much of the region's Black suburban population, with the overwhelming majority residing along Interstate 57, east to the Bishop Ford Expressway and the Indiana state border. The south suburbs are also home to the highest black homeownership rates in the country, with five of its communities ranked in the top ten in 2018.

The region is also home to a high Polish, Lithuanian, Palestinian, Irish, Dutch, German, and Mexican population.

Municipalities

Cook County

 Alsip
 Bedford Park
 Blue Island
 Bridgeview
 Burbank
 Burnham 
 Calumet City
 Calumet Park 
 Chicago Heights
 Chicago Ridge
 Country Club Hills
 Crestwood
 Dixmoor 
 Dolton
 East Hazel Crest
 Evergreen Park
 Flossmoor
 Ford Heights
 Forest View
 Glenwood
 Harvey
 Hazel Crest
 Hickory Hills
 Hometown
 Homewood
 Justice
 Lansing
 Lynwood
 Markham
 Matteson
 Merrionette Park
 Midlothian
 Oak Forest
 Oak Lawn
 Olympia Fields
 Orland Hills
 Orland Park (vast majority)
 Palos Heights
 Palos Hills
 Palos Park
 Park Forest (vast majority)
 Phoenix
 Posen
 Richton Park
 Riverdale
 Robbins
 Sauk Village (vast majority)
 South Chicago Heights
 South Holland
 Steger (partially)
 Summit
 Thornton
 Tinley Park (vast majority)
 Worth

Will County
 Beecher
 Crete
 Frankfort (vast majority)
 Homer Glen
 Mokena
 Monee
 New Lenox
 Peotone
 University Park (vast majority)

Transportation

Air transit
The possibility of an airport in Peotone has been discussed since 1968, with official planning beginning in 1984. However, due to concerns that this would negatively impact the environment, the project has yet to be completed. As late as 2014, Illinois Governor Pat Quinn expressed intention to continue with the project, despite slowdown from the FAA.

Mass transit

The Metra Electric District, Rock Island District and Southwest Service Metra lines serve Chicago Southland commuters. 
Pace also operates several bus lines in the Chicago Southland, with operating divisions in Markham and a major facility in South Holland.

Interstate highways
Interstate 55
Interstate 57
Interstate 80
Interstate 94
Interstate 294
Interstate 355

Crime
Generally, crime in the Southland tends to be slightly higher than the other suburban regions of Chicago. Most of the violent crime occurs in the south suburbs, such as Harvey, which in 2019, recorded 23 homicides, the most of any suburb in Cook County.

Shopping centers/Malls
Chicago Ridge Mall (Chicago Ridge, Illinois)
Orland Park Place (Orland Park, Illinois)
Orland Square Mall (Orland Park, Illinois)
River Oaks Center (Calumet City, Illinois)

Attractions 
SeatGeek Stadium (Bridgeview, Illinois)
Hollywood Casino Amphitheatre (Tinley Park, Illinois)
Thornton Quarry (Thornton, Illinois)
Lincoln Oasis (South Holland, Illinois)

Post-secondary education
There are a variety of community colleges and universities in the Chicago Southland including:
Governors State University (University Park, Illinois)
Moraine Valley Community College (Palos Hills, Illinois)
Prairie State College (Chicago Heights, Illinois)
South Suburban College (South Holland, Illinois)
Trinity Christian College (Palos Heights, Illinois)

References

External links
Chicago Southland Convention & Visitors Bureau 
South Suburban Mayors and Managers Association and Chicago Southland Economic Development Corporation
Southwest Conference of Mayors

Chicago metropolitan area